The women's 400 metres hurdles event at the 1998 Commonwealth Games was held on 18 September on National Stadium, Bukit Jalil.

Results

References

400
1998
1998 in women's athletics